Eddie Dibbs was the defending champion but lost in the semifinals to Harold Solomon.

Solomon won in the final 5–7, 6–4, 7–6 against José Higueras.

Seeds

  Jimmy Connors (second round, withdrew)
  Roscoe Tanner (third round)
  Guillermo Vilas (semifinals)
  Harold Solomon (champion)
  Eddie Dibbs (semifinals)
  José Higueras (final)
  Victor Pecci (quarterfinals)
  José Luis Clerc (quarterfinals)
  Brian Gottfried (third round)
  Manuel Orantes (second round)
  Tim Gullikson (second round)
  John Alexander (first round)
  Balázs Taróczy (quarterfinals)
  Brian Teacher (third round)
  Corrado Barazzutti (quarterfinals)
  Johan Kriek (first round)

Draw

Finals

Top half

Section 1

Section 2

Bottom half

Section 3

Section 4

External links
 1979 Volvo International draw 

Singles